St. Francis Circle is a light rail stop on the Muni Metro K Ingleside and M Ocean View lines, located in the St. Francis Wood neighborhood of San Francisco, California. It opened around 1907 when the United Railroads (URR) expanded its Ocean Avenue line west to Ocean Beach; Muni service followed with the K in 1918 and the M in 1925.

History 

The 1906 earthquake damaged many cable car and streetcar lines; in the aftermath, the United Railroads (URR) closed many cable cars lines and expanded the electric streetcar system. The URR resumed service on the Ocean Avenue (12) line on May 6, 1906; the line was soon extended to Ocean Beach via Junipero Serra Boulevard and Sloat Boulevard.

The city-owned Twin Peaks Tunnel was opened on February 3, 1918, with the K Ingleside line running through the tunnel and terminating at St. Francis Circle to avoid crossing the existing private tracks. In November 1918, the San Francisco Municipal Railway reached an agreement with the URR to allow the city's streetcars to use Market Street Railway trackage. The K Ingleside line was thus extended southwards from St. Francis Circle on Junipero Serra Boulevard and east on Ocean Avenue on February 21, 1919. M Ocean View service began on October 6, 1925; the new line split from the existing tracks in the circle and ran southwest on a private right-of-way. The city purchased the private company (renamed Market Street Railway in 1921) in 1944; route 12 streetcar service ended on April 8, 1945, leaving just the K Ingleside on Junipero Serra Boulevard.

In 2010, Muni replaced the rail junction just south of the station. Rail service south of West Portal station was replaced with buses from May 17 to September 4.

References

External links 

SFMTA – West Portal/Sloat/St Francis Circle inbound and outbound
SFBay Transit (unofficial) – West Portal/Sloat/St Francis Circle

Muni Metro stations
Railway stations in the United States opened in 1907